Joachim Martin Falbe (11 June 1709 – 22 March 1782) was a German portrait painter.

Biography

Born in Berlin in 1709, Falbe was instructed at first by Harper and later by A. Pesne.  At Pesne's suggestion Falbe was appointed court painter of Prince August Ludwig von Anhalt-Köthen in 1739.

Several etchings based on Rembrandt's paintings, or in the master's style, are attributed to him. Some extant copies are signed with Falbe's monogram have survived. In 1764 he was elected a member of the Academy at Berlin, in which city he died in 1782.

References

 

1709 births
1782 deaths
18th-century German painters
18th-century German male artists
German male painters
German portrait painters
Artists from Berlin